The Aerial Demonstration Squadron, popularly known as Smoke Squadron (Portuguese: Esquadrilha da Fumaça) is the Brazilian Air Force's air demonstration squadron.

History 
Its first display was on 14 May 1952 over Copacabana beach, using the North American T-6 Texan. The team used the T-6 from its formation until 1968, when it switched to the French Aérospatiale (Fouga) CM.170-2 Super Magister jet, called T-24 in FAB service. However, this model proved unsuitable to Brazilian conditions and, in 1972, the squadron reverted to the T-6, which was used until 1977.

The EDA was disbanded in 1977, but reformed on 8 December 1983 using Neiva T-25 Universal piston-powered aircraft, soon to be replaced by the then-new Embraer EMB-312 Tucano turboprop trainer. At the time the EDA's aircraft were painted a bright red scheme, which has since been superseded by the current gloss blue.

Objectives

 To bring together civilian and military aeronautical communities
 To contribute towards a better integration between the Air Force and the other Armed Forces
 To represent the Brazilian Air Force in Brazil and abroad
 To encourage youngsters to take up civilian and military aeronautical careers
 To show the quality of the Brazilian aerospace industry
 To show the capabilities of the Brazilian Air Force crews.

Aircraft
The aircraft used by the EDA have been, in chronological order:
 North American T-6 Texan for 1225 displays;
 Aérospatiale (Fouga) CM.170-2 Super Magister for 46 displays;
 Neiva T-25 Universal for 55 displays;
 Embraer EMB-312 Tucano with more than 2000 displays as of 2010;
 Embraer EMB-314 Super Tucano, being the two first ones delivered on September 30, 2012. In the subsequent two years, Super Tucanos have replaced the Tucano in the Smoke Squadron

References

External links
  
  
 Video showing the Esquadrilha da Fumaça in action

Brazilian Air Force
Aerobatic teams